Nord-Rana (historically: Mo herred) is a former municipality in Nordland county, Norway. The  municipality existed from 1839 until its dissolution in 1964. From 1839 until 1844, it was named Nord-Ranen, from 1844 until 1923, it was called Mo, and then from 1923 until 1964 it was named Nord-Rana. The former municipality was located at the innermost part of the Ranfjorden. It encompassed the eastern 90% of what is now Rana Municipality.  The administrative centre was the village of Ytteren, just north of the town of Mo i Rana.

History
Rana Municipality was established on 1 January 1838 under the old formannskapsdistrikt law. Shortly afterwards, in 1839, the municipality was divided into Nord-Ranen and Sør-Ranen. In 1844, Nord-Ranen was renamed Mo. On 1 January 1923, the village of Mo was designated as a ladested and so it was separated from the rest of the municipality to become a municipality of its own. The new town of Mo (population: 1,305) kept the name Mo and the rest of the old municipality became known as Nord-Rana (bringing back the old name for the area).

During the 1960s, there were many municipal mergers across Norway due to the work of the Schei Committee. On 1 January 1964, the municipality of Nord-Rana (population: 11,636) was merged with the town of Mo i Rana (population: 9,616), the part of the municipality of Sør-Rana located north of the Ranfjorden (population: 697), and the Sjona area of Nesna Municipality (population: 543) to create the large, new Rana Municipality.

Name
The municipality is named Nord-Rana. The first element is nord which directly translates to "northern". The second element is Rana which comes from the local river Ranelva. The name of the river is probably derived from the word  which means "quick", "fast", or "rapid". Another possibility is that the name comes from the old Sami god Rana Niejta.

Government
While it existed, this municipality was responsible for primary education (through 10th grade), outpatient health services, senior citizen services, unemployment, social services, zoning, economic development, and municipal roads. During its existence, this municipality was governed by a municipal council of elected representatives, which in turn elected a mayor.

Municipal council
The municipal council  of Nord-Rana was made up of 35 representatives that were elected to four year terms.  The party breakdown of the final municipal council was as follows:

Mayors
The mayors of Nord-Rana:

 1838–1842: Hans Wølner
 1842–1844: Johannes Hansen
 1844–1847: Holger Olsen Enge
 1848–1851: Agathon Bartholomæus Hansteen
 1852–1854: Johannes Hansen
 1854–1856: Jens Jensen Yttermark
 1857–1860: Jakob Jæger
 1860–1864: Jens Jensen Yttermark
 1865–1866: Peder Johanessen
 1867–1874: Jens Pedersen Ånes
 1874–1877: Jens Jensen Yttermark
 1877–1883: Jonas Frost Enga
 1883–1888: Anders Bang Hanssen Leirbakhei
 1889–1894: Hans P. Johnsen
 1895–1901: Jakob Thode Jakobsen
 1902–1907: Einar Nilsen
 1908–1910: Ragnvald Hvoslef
 1911–1913: Peder Pedersen
 1914–1916: Johannes Skaar
 1917–1922: Redvald Knudtson
 1923-1924: Peder Pedersen Ytteren (Bp)
 1925-1939: Åsmund Olsen Selfors (NKP)
 1940-1940: Einar Aanes (Ap)
 1945-1950: Einar Aanes (Ap)
 1950-1963: Eilif M. Davidsen (Ap)
 1963-1964: Per Karstensen (Ap)

See also
List of former municipalities of Norway

References

Rana, Norway
Former municipalities of Norway
1839 establishments in Norway
1964 disestablishments in Norway